Propleopus is an extinct genus of marsupials. Three species are known: P. chillagoensis from the Plio-Pleistocene, and P. oscillans and P. wellingtonensis from the Pleistocene. In contrast to most other kangaroos, and similar to their small extant relative, the musky rat-kangaroo, they were probably omnivorous.

The species assigned to this genus are:

Propleopus chillagoensis Archer et al., 1978
Propleopus oscillans (De Vis, 1888) (type species)
Propleopus wellingtonensis (Archer & Flannery, 1985)

References

John A. Long et al.: Prehistoric Mammals of Australia and New Guinea. Johns Hopkins University Press, Baltimore 2003, .

 THE GIANT RAT-KANGAROO PROPLEOPUS OSCILLANS (DE VIS)

Prehistoric macropods
Carnivorous marsupials
Prehistoric mammals of Australia
Pleistocene marsupials
Prehistoric marsupial genera
Fossil taxa described in 1924